Thomas Jacobs may refer to:

Thomas M. Jacobs (1926–2014), American Olympic Nordic skier
Tommy Jacobs (born 1935), American golfer
Thomas "Peter" Jacobs (born 2008), South African-Irish micronationalist

See also
Thomas Jacob (disambiguation)